Secter is a surname. Notable people with the surname include:

David Secter (born 1943), Canadian film director
Harvey Secter, chancellor of the University of Manitoba

See also
Decter